Paula Valdivia Drayer (born 5 June 1997) is a Chilean field hockey player.

Villagran has represented Chile at both senior and junior levels, making her debut for both teams in 2016.

In 2016, Valdivia represented the Chile national junior team at the 2016 Junior World Cup, where the team finished in 11th place.

Valdivia was also part of the Chile team at the 2017 Pan American Cup. At the tournament, Chile recorded a historic 4–3 victory over the United States, entering the final for the first time.

At the 2018 South American Games in Cochabamba, Bolivia, Valdivia was part of the Chile team that won a bronze medal.

References

1997 births
Living people
Chilean female field hockey players
South American Games gold medalists for Chile
South American Games bronze medalists for Chile
South American Games medalists in field hockey
Competitors at the 2018 South American Games
Competitors at the 2022 South American Games
21st-century Chilean women